AVU may refer to:
 Academy of Fine Arts, Prague (acronym AVU)
 Asian Vegetarian Union
 Aceite Vegetal Usado